Čapljinac is a village situated in Doljevac municipality, Nišava District in Serbia. Čapljinac is nearby to Belotinac, Čaplinci and Batušinac.

References

Populated places in Nišava District